Stephen R. Lyons is a retired four-star general in the United States Army who last served as the 13th commander of the United States Transportation Command from August 2018 to October 2021. He previously served as the commanding general of United States Army Combined Arms Support Command/Sustainment Center of Excellence as well as the senior mission commander for Fort Lee, Virginia, from 2014 to 2015.

Early life
Lyons is a 1979 graduate of the La Salle Institute, an all-male private Catholic college preparatory school in Troy, New York. He later earned an associate's degree in criminal justice from Hudson Valley Community College. In 1983, he graduated from the Rochester Institute of Technology and commissioned through ROTC as a second lieutenant in the Ordnance Corps.

Military education
Lyons received a Master of Science degree in logistics management from the Naval Postgraduate School in 1993 and a Master of Science in national resource strategy from the Industrial College of the Armed Forces in 2005.

Military career
Lyons served as battalion executive officer for the Division Support Command and also as the executive officer and Division Materiel Management Center Chief in the 1st Armored Division in Germany. Lyons was the Plans Officer for the J-4 United States Central Command. His battalion command was with the 703rd Main Support Battalion and he later served as the G-4 of the 3rd Infantry Division. He commanded the 82nd Airborne Division Support Command and later commanded the 82nd Sustainment Brigade. He served as the executive officer to the Commander, United States Army Materiel Command. He has served with the International Security Assistance Force (ISAF) as C/J-4. He was the Director, Logistics Operations, Readiness, Force Integration and Strategy at Headquarters, Department of the Army G-4.

Lyons commanded of the 8th Theater Sustainment Command (TSC) at Schofield Barracks, Hawaii from 2012 to 2014. The 8th TSC is responsible for logistics and sustainment of the army in the Pacific. The command spans 9,000 miles and controls units providing supplies, maintenance, transport, engineer, personnel, and military police from Alaska to Korea.

From August 22, 2014 to August 7, 2015, Lyons commanded the Combined Arms Support Command/Sustainment Center of Excellence at Fort Lee, Virginia.

Lyons deployed for two tours to Iraq (2003, 2006–2008) in support of Operation Iraqi Freedom and later to Afghanistan (2009–2011) in support of Operation Enduring Freedom. He was involved in Hurricane Katrina Relief Operations in New Orleans, Louisiana in 2005. He served in 1996 in Bosnia-Herzegovina during Operation Joint Endeavor as part of the Implementation Force (IFOR) and deployed in 1989 for Operation Just Cause in Panama.

After serving as the Deputy Commanding General for United States Transportation Command at Scott Air Force Base, Illinois, Lyons was assigned as the Director for Logistics (J4) on the Joint Staff. In April 2018, Lyons was nominated for promotion to general and assignment as commander of United States Transportation Command. He was confirmed by the United States Senate and took command of United States Transportation Command on August 24, 2018. Lyons is the first ever non-Air Force officer to lead Transportation Command.

His retirement ceremony was held on October 15, 2021, with the retirement effective November 30, 2021.

Post-military career 
On May 27, 2022, the White House and the U.S. Department of Transportation announced that Retired General Lyons, would be the new Port and Supply Chain Envoy to the Biden-Harris Administration’s Supply Chain Disruptions Task Force, taking over the role from John Porcari. In this role, Lyons is responsible for working with ports, rail, trucking and other private companies across the transportation logistics supply chain to address bottlenecks, speed up the movement of goods, and help lower costs.

Awards and decorations

References

Year of birth missing (living people)
Living people
Rochester Institute of Technology alumni
Naval Postgraduate School alumni
Dwight D. Eisenhower School for National Security and Resource Strategy alumni
Recipients of the Defense Distinguished Service Medal
Recipients of the Distinguished Service Medal (US Army)
Recipients of the Defense Superior Service Medal
Recipients of the Legion of Merit
United States Army personnel of the Iraq War
United States Army generals